is an HRT station on Astram Line, located in 608-3, Ozuka, Numata-cho, Asaminami-ku, Hiroshima, Japan.

Platforms

Connections
█ Astram Line
●Tomo-chūō — ●Ōzuka — ●Kōiki-kōen-mae

Bus services connections

Local bus
Hiroden Bus
Chugoku JR Bus
Hiroshima Bus
Geiyo Bus
Hiroshima Kotsu

Around station
Ozuka Post Office
Hiroshima City University
Hiroshima Kouiki Kouen

History
Opened on August 20, 1994.

See also
Astram Line
Hiroshima Rapid Transit

References

Astram Line stations
Railway stations in Japan opened in 1994